Samuel Crocker Lawrence (November 22, 1832 – September 24, 1911)  was a Massachusetts politician who served as the first Mayor of Medford, Massachusetts. Lawrence was born in Medford on November 22, 1832, to Daniel and Elizabeth (Crocker) Lawrence.

During the American Civil War, he served as colonel of the 5th Massachusetts Volunteer Infantry.  After the war he became a Veteran Companion of the Military Order of the Loyal Legion of the United States.

In 1869 he was elected captain of the Ancient and Honorable Artillery Company of Massachusetts.

A highly active Freemason, Lawrence served as Most Worshipful Grand Master of Massachusetts from 1881 to 1883.  In 1884 he was installed as a 33rd Degree Mason. From 1909 to 1910 her served as the Sovereign Grand Commander of the Northern Masonic Jurisdiction of the Scottish Rite.

He was a director of the Eastern, Maine Central and Boston and Maine railroads.

References

1822 births
Mayors of Medford, Massachusetts
Harvard College alumni
People of Massachusetts in the American Civil War
1911 deaths
19th-century American politicians